"I Can't Even Touch You" is a song by the British singer-songwriter Steve Harley, which was released in 1982 as a non-album single under his band's name Steve Harley & Cockney Rebel. The song was written by Harley and produced by Midge Ure.

Background
"I Can't Even Touch You" was Harley's first release of new material since his 1979 album The Candidate. The song was first introduced live during Steve Harley and Cockney Rebel's 1981 Christmas tour, where Harley also featured two other new tracks, "Don't Shoot, Till You See The Whites Of Their Eyes" (a.k.a. "The Race Game") and "Not From Her World" (a cover of a 4 Out of 5 Doctors song). The recording and subsequent release of "I Can't Even Touch You" as a single came to fruition after Harley made a deal with Chris Wright, the founder and chairman of Chrysalis Records. The pair had met at the Sandown Park Racecourse, and as a result of a conversation there, Harley sent Wright the song's demo recording. Showing interest in the song, Wright then suggested that Midge Ure produce it.

The song was soon recorded with Ure in the producer's chair. In the studio, Alan Darby, Cockney Rebel's guitarist of the time, laid down the original eight-to-the-bar chugging rhythm part of the track. Ure thought Darby's contribution was slightly off-beat at times and therefore re-did the part himself. Darby played the lead guitar parts on the track. The piano and keyboards on the song were performed by Andy Qunta, later of Icehouse fame, who joined Steve Harley and Cockney Rebel in late 1981.

Speaking to the Evening Express in March 1982, Harley said, "The only reason I haven't made records since The Candidate is that I have had nothing of merit to say. Who does, come to that, in rock 'n' roll? But I thought I'd wait until I met the right people to manage me, the right record company to record me and the right frame of mind to carry me through."

"I Can't Even Touch You" was released in March 1982, but failed to make an appearance in the UK Singles Chart. It did, however, reach number 132 on the Record Business Bubbling Under Singles chart on 5 April. It dropped to number 137 the following week and number 144 the week after that. Both Chrysalis and fans of Steve Harley & Cockney Rebel had believed at the time that the song would become a hit. It was Harley's only release that year and his only through Chrysalis. Although not released in North America, the song gained some airplay on the Toronto rock radio station CFNY-FM in April–May 1982.

In 1985, Harley recalled of the song's lack of commercial success, "Midge and I always talk about that [song]. We were both very disappointed [that it wasn't a hit]." Harley and Ure worked together again in circa 1984 on another Harley solo track, but the song has never been released. Harley also gave Ure some lyrics for potential use on his first solo album, but they were not used.

Release
"I Can't Even Touch You" was released by Chrysalis Records on 7-inch vinyl in the UK, Germany, the Netherlands, Spain and Portugal. The B-side, "I Can Be Anyone", was also written by Harley and produced by Ure. The track has remained exclusive to the single and has not appeared on any other release. "I Can Be Anyone" was first introduced live during Cockney Rebel's 1980 Christmas tour, along with two other new songs, "My Cold Heart" and "Such is Life". The single was released with a full colour picture sleeve, featuring a photograph of Harley.

Shortly after its release, "I Can't Even Touch You" and its B-side were the first tracks to be acquired by music publishers Star Street Music Ltd, which was established in 1982 by Eric Hall as a joint venture company with EMI Music Publishing.

Following its release as a single, the song would later appear on three Steve Harley & Cockney Rebel compilations: 1999's The Cream of Steve Harley & Cockney Rebel, 2006's The Cockney Rebel – A Steve Harley Anthology and 2008's The Best of Steve Harley and Cockney Rebel. It also appeared as a bonus track on the 2000 CD release of Harley's 1979 album The Candidate.

Promotion
A full-page black-and-white advert was included in the 27 March 1982 issue of Melody Maker and a smaller advert included in the 1 April 1982 issue of Smash Hits to promote the release of the new single.

The song has been performed live on a number of occasions. It was performed at Steve Harley & Cockney Rebel's 1984 concert at the Camden Palace, London, which was filmed for TV and released on the VHS Live from London in 1985. When the band returned to touring in 1989, the song was occasionally included in the set-list. Around 2004, the song was again reintroduced for a brief time, and was performed live at Glastonbury Festival in 2005.

Critical reception
On its release, Tim de Lisle of Smash Hits commented in a review of the single, "Produced, like Visage, by the tireless Midge Ure but beyond that there's not much else to be said for it. Pleasant, colourless and a far cry from his hits of the 70s." Sunie Fletcher of Record Mirror wrote, "Laidback rock music for (ahem) mature tastes, I suppose. Not mine, certainly, but the tune is very pretty and it's all very tasteful and that."

Julie Burchill of New Musical Express stated, "An insipid Cockney encore for those wonderful swollen vowels you'll remember forever and all-round tortured mediocrity. Music not to give up your day-job to. Mr Harley was led back from the wilderness by M. Ure of Samaritans Inc." Brian Aitken of the Evening Express wrote, "'I Can't Even Touch You' may not be top ten material but it contains enough evidence to suggest that a fresh Steve Harley is ready for stardom again." Simon Mares of the Reading Evening Post commented, "After years in the wilderness, Steve Harley and Cockney Rebel return with a Midge Ure-produced song which has Steve sounding very like Bowie.

In the unreleased 1991 book The Steve Harley & Cockney Rebel Story, author Hans Peters described the song as "a surrealistic love song". In a review of the band's performance at the 2005 Glastonbury Festival, eFestivals writer Karen Morrison said: "...'When the Halo Slips' and 'I Can't Even Touch You' follow with their full on keyboards and the applause is deafening."

Track listing
7-inch single
"I Can't Even Touch You" – 4:04
"I Can Be Anyone" – 3:20

Personnel
 Steve Harley – vocals
 Midge Ure – producer, rhythm guitar
 Alan Darby – lead guitar
 Andy Qunta – piano, keyboards

Charts

References

1982 songs
1982 singles
Chrysalis Records singles
Steve Harley songs
Songs written by Steve Harley